Caloparyphus crotchi is a species of soldier fly in the family Stratiomyidae.

Distribution
Canada, United States.

References

Stratiomyidae
Insects described in 1877
Diptera of North America
Taxa named by Carl Robert Osten-Sacken